

Rudolf Reichert (24 November 1893 – 10 March 1967) was a general in the Wehrmacht of Nazi Germany. He was a recipient of the Knight's Cross of the Iron Cross.

Awards and decorations

 Knight's Cross of the Iron Cross on 11 March 1945 as Generalmajor and commander of the 292. Infanterie-Division

References

Citations

Bibliography

 

1893 births
1967 deaths
People from Nebra (Unstrut)
People from the Province of Saxony
Lieutenant generals of the German Army (Wehrmacht)
Prussian Army personnel
German Army personnel of World War I
Reichswehr personnel
German prisoners of war in World War II held by the United Kingdom
Recipients of the clasp to the Iron Cross, 1st class
Recipients of the Gold German Cross
Recipients of the Knight's Cross of the Iron Cross
Military personnel from Saxony-Anhalt
German Army generals of World War II